Normanton is an electoral ward in the city of Derby, England.  The ward contains five listed buildings that are recorded in the National Heritage List for England.  All the listed buildings are designated at Grade II, the lowest of the three grades, which is applied to "buildings of national importance and special interest".  The ward contains Normanton, originally a village, later a suburb to the south of the centre of the city.  The listed buildings consist of houses, cottages and a war memorial.
  

Buildings

References

Citations

Sources

 

Lists of listed buildings in Derbyshire
Listed buildings in Derby